Elias Menachem Stein (January 13, 1931 – December 23, 2018) was an American mathematician who was a leading figure in the field of harmonic analysis. He was the Albert Baldwin Dod Professor of Mathematics, Emeritus, at Princeton University, where he was a faculty member from 1963 until his death in 2018.

Biography
Stein was born in Antwerp Belgium, to Elkan Stein and Chana Goldman, Ashkenazi Jews from Belgium. After the German invasion in 1940, the Stein family fled to the United States, first arriving in New York City. He graduated from Stuyvesant High School in 1949, where he was classmates with future Fields Medalist Paul Cohen, before moving on to the University of Chicago for college. In 1955, Stein earned a Ph.D. from the University of Chicago under the direction of Antoni Zygmund. He began teaching at MIT in 1955, moved to the University of Chicago in 1958 as an assistant professor, and in 1963 became a full professor at Princeton.

Stein worked primarily in the field of harmonic analysis, and made contributions in both extending and clarifying Calderón–Zygmund theory. These include Stein interpolation (a variable-parameter version of complex interpolation), the Stein maximal principle (showing that under many circumstances, almost everywhere convergence is equivalent to the boundedness of
a maximal function), Stein complementary series representations, Nikishin–Pisier–Stein factorization in operator theory, the Tomas–Stein restriction theorem in Fourier analysis, the Kunze–Stein phenomenon in convolution on semisimple groups, the Cotlar–Stein lemma concerning the sum of almost orthogonal operators, and the Fefferman–Stein theory of the Hardy space  and the space  of functions of bounded mean oscillation.

He wrote numerous books on harmonic analysis (see e.g. [1,3,5]), which are often cited as the standard references on the subject. His Princeton Lectures in Analysis series [6,7,8,9] were penned for his sequence of undergraduate courses on analysis at Princeton. Stein was also noted as having trained a high number of graduate students (he has had at least 52 students, according to the Mathematics Genealogy Project), so shaping modern Fourier analysis. They include two Fields medalists, Charles Fefferman and Terence Tao.

His honors included the Steele Prize (1984 and 2002), the Schock Prize in Mathematics (1993), the Wolf Prize in Mathematics (1999), and the National Medal of Science (2001). In addition, he had fellowships to National Science Foundation, Sloan Foundation, Guggenheim Foundation, and National Academy of Sciences. Stein was elected as a member of the American Academy of Arts and Sciences in 1982. In 2005, Stein was awarded the Stefan Bergman prize in recognition of his contributions in real, complex, and harmonic analysis. In 2012 he became a fellow of the American Mathematical Society.

Personal life
In 1959, he married Elly Intrator, a former Jewish refugee during World War II. They had two children, Karen Stein and Jeremy C. Stein, and grandchildren named Alison, Jason, and Carolyn. His son Jeremy is a  professor of financial economics at Harvard, former adviser to Tim Geithner and Lawrence Summers, and served on the Federal Reserve Board of Governors from 2012 to 2014. Elias Stein died of complications of lymphoma in 2018, aged 87.

Bibliography

 2011 reprint
 2010 reprint 
 2009 reprint

Notes

References

External links

 Citation for Elias Stein for the 2002 Steele prize for lifetime achievement
 Elias Stein Curriculum Vitae

  – Extended video interview.

1931 births
2018 deaths
20th-century American mathematicians
21st-century American mathematicians
American people of Belgian-Jewish descent
Belgian emigrants to the United States
Belgian Jews
Fellows of the American Mathematical Society
Harmonic analysis
Jewish American scientists
Mathematicians from New York (state)
Mathematical analysts
Members of the United States National Academy of Sciences
National Medal of Science laureates
Princeton University faculty
Rolf Schock Prize laureates
Stuyvesant High School alumni
University of Chicago alumni
Wolf Prize in Mathematics laureates